Sandy Block, also credited as Sid Block (January 16, 1917 – October 1985) was an American jazz bassist.

Early life 
Block played violin as a child, and grew up in Cleveland and Brooklyn. He picked up bass in high school and worked professionally in big bands from the late 1930s.

Career 
Block worked with Van Alexander, Chick Webb, Alvino Rey, and Tommy Dorsey and recorded with Louis Armstrong and Ella Fitzgerald. He played with Charlie Parker on the only television appearance Parker ever made.

After the 1950s, Block worked extensively as a studio musician, including for folk ensembles such as The Greenbriar Boys. He played with Jimmy McPartland and Johnny Costa, but went into semi-retirement after the 1960s.

References

External links
 Sandy Block recordings at the Discography of American Historical Recordings.

1917 births
American jazz double-bassists
Male double-bassists
1985 deaths
20th-century American musicians
20th-century double-bassists
20th-century American male musicians
American male jazz musicians